Showtime Live Chiayi is a shopping mall in West District, Chiayi City, Taiwan that opened on January 30, 2016.

Design
For the overall design of Showtime Live Chiayi, the American international design team Hirsch Bedner Associates was employed.

Gallery

See also
 List of tourist attractions in Taiwan
 Nice Plaza
 Showtime Live Taichung Wenxin
 Showtime Live Taichung Station
 Showtime Live Shulin
 Showtime Live Taitung

References

External links

2016 establishments in Taiwan
Shopping malls in Chiayi City
Shopping malls established in 2016